Convoy SC 42 was the 42nd of the numbered series of World War II Slow Convoys of merchant ships from Sydney, Cape Breton Island to Liverpool. SC 42 was attacked over a three night period in September 1941, losing 16 ships sunk and 4 damaged. This was the worst Allied loss following the attack on convoy SC 7 the previous year. Two attacking U-boats were destroyed.

Background
Sixty-five ships departed Sydney (Nova Scotia) on 30 August 1941 under local escort, bound for Liverpool. The convoy commodore was Rear Admiral WB Mackenzie in Everleigh.

Ranged against them was the Markgraf wolf pack, a group of 14 U-boats in a patrol line southeast of Greenland.

Action
Early on 9 September  sighted the convoy near Cape Farewell, Greenland, and made an unsuccessful torpedo attack. She then commenced shadowing, while other Markgraf boats moved in. The moon rose on the southern side on the convoy that night, and  torpedoed the silhouetted 5229-GRT British freighter Muneric. Muneric and her cargo of 7000 tons of iron ore sank rapidly with all 63 of her crew. Kenogami commenced firing on a surfaced U-boat without benefit of star shell or flashless powder, and quickly lost contact as the crew lost their night-vision in the flash of gunfire.

The convoy made two emergency turns over the next half-hour as ships in convoy reported sighting three more surfaced U-boats.  Another emergency convoy turn ninety minutes later caught Skeena pursuing a contact at speed. While maneuvering to avoid collision, Skeena passed a surfaced U-boat on a reciprocal course, being fired upon by ships in convoy so closely that Skeenas guns could not be depressed to bear.  torpedoed Baron Pentland and Tahchee during the excitement. The tanker Tahchee was towed back to port by Orillia but the 3410-GRT British freighter Baron Pentland sank with 1512 standards of lumber and two of her crew.

Another emergency turn by the convoy brought two hours of suspenseful quiet while Orillia aided Tahchee and searched for survivors astern of the convoy. Then U-432 torpedoed the 3205-GRT Dutch freighter Winterswijk and the 1113-GRT Norwegian freighter Stargard. The freighter Regin stopped to rescue Starguards survivors and opened fire on a surfaced U-boat.  While Skeena and Kenogami searched for U-boats around stricken Winterswijk and Stargard,  torpedoed the 3252-GRT British freighter Sally Maersk, and the convoy made another emergency turn to avoid a surfaced U-boat.  torpedoed the 7465-GRT British CAM ship Empire Hudson less than two hours after Skeena regained station ahead of the convoy.

Daylight on 10 September brought several periscope sightings and emergency turns by the convoy before U-85 torpedoed the 4748-GRT British freighter Thistleglen. Skeena and Alberni counterattacked and damaged U-85 with depth charges. Thistleglen sank with 5200 tons of steel, 2400 tons of pig iron, and 3 of her crew.

U-82 torpedoed the 7519-GRT British tanker Bulysses that evening. U-82 then torpedoed the 3915-GRT British freighter Gypsum Queen shortly after the convoy ordered an emergency turn. Gypsum Queen sank quickly with 5500 tons of sulfur and ten of her crew. Bulysses sank with 9300 tons of gas oil and 4 of her crew. Other ships in convoy rescued the survivors. The corvettes Chambly and Moose Jaw observed the fireworks of these attacks and surprised  while steaming to reinforce the escort. U-501 was first depth-charged by Chambly then rammed by Moose Jaw as the damaged submarine surfaced. The captain of U-501 jumped from the conning tower to Moose Jaws deck; and Moose Jaw sent a boarding party to enter the submarine. Eleven Germans and one of the Canadian boarding party (Stoker William Brown) were lost when U-501 sank. U-501 was the first U-boat sunk by Canadian escorts.

Just after midnight on 10/11 September  torpedoed the 4924-GRT British freighter Berury and the 4815-GRT British freighter Stonepool, while Chambly and Moose Jaw were attacking U-501. Then U-432 torpedoed the 1231-GRT Swedish freighter Garm and U-82 torpedoed the 5463-GRT British freighter Empire Crossbill and the 1980-GRT Swedish freighter Scania two hours later while Alberni, Kenogami and Moose Jaw were rescuing survivors of Berury and Stonepool.  launched torpedoes unsuccessfully,  damaged the Norwegian 2200-GRT freighter Bestum,  sank the crippled Scania, while  sank the Panamanian-flagged straggler Montana.

Leamington and Veteran dropped 21 depth charges on the afternoon of 11 September while investigating an RAF Coastal Command aircraft report of a U-boat ahead of the convoy. Postwar analysis indicated their attacks probably destroyed U-207.

Aftermath
With the arrival of these reinforcements further attacks by Markgraf were stifled. Though the group continued to shadow, it was unable to mount any further assaults.

The last incident of the voyage took place three days later when  torpedoed the 4392-ton British freighter Jedmore as the convoy approached North Channel on the late afternoon of 16 September.

Convoy SC 42 arrived in Liverpool on 20 September 1941. Sixteen ships totalling 68,259 GRT had been sunk and four ships (14,132 GRT) damaged. One ship had turned back. Forty four ships arrived safely and unharmed, and two U-boats had been destroyed, though one of these sinkings was not confirmed until after the war.

Table of losses

Allied ships sunk

U-boats destroyed

See also
 Convoy Battles of World War II

Notes

References

External links
SC 42 at convoyweb
SC 42 at warsailors.com
 SC 42 at uboatnet

Further reading

SC042
Naval battles of World War II involving Canada
C